Kirk Lake may refer to:

 Kirk Lake (Minnesota), a lake in Clearwater County.
 Kirk Lake (New York), a controlled lake in the Town of Carmel in Putnam County.